Scrobipalpa picta is a moth in the family Gelechiidae. It was described by Povolný in 1969. It is found in Afghanistan.

The forewings are whitish with a broad blackish band from the base to the tip. The apex is sprinkled with blackish scales. The hindwings are covered with grey-blackish scales.

References

Scrobipalpa
Moths described in 1969
Taxa named by Dalibor Povolný